Erwin Teshiba Tulfo is a Filipino news anchor, broadcaster, and columnist who was the Secretary of Social Welfare and Development from June 30 to December 27, 2022, when his appointment was blocked and bypassed by the Commission on Appointments, during the presidency of Bongbong Marcos.

He previously worked with PTV's flagship primetime news program Ulat Bayan and one of its AM radio counterpart Radyo Pilipinas (RP1)'s Tutok Erwin Tulfo. He was the host of Tutok Tulfo, co-host of T3: Kapatid Sagot Kita! together with his brothers Raffy and Ben, and one of news anchors of Aksyon on TV5 and AksyonTV. He has also worked for ABS-CBN, Radio Philippines Network (RPN), and Intercontinental Broadcasting Corporation (IBC).

Biography
Tulfo is the son of Colonel Ramon Silvestre Tulfo Sr., who was a member of Philippine Constabulary, and Caridad Teshiba-Tulfo, a housewife. His brothers include Ramon, Ben, and Raffy Tulfo, who is also an incumbent senator. His sister, Wanda Corazon Teo, was a tourism secretary during the Duterte administration.

He served in the United States Army from 1988 to 1992. He graduated with a bachelor of science in Business Administration from the University of the East in 2005. He is the host of his public service brand Mission X, which eventually evolved into the Erwin Tulfo Action Center.

Controversies

The cases stemmed from multiple articles he wrote and published in the tabloid Remate which accused a Bureau of Customs official of being "an extortionist, a corrupt public official, smuggler and having illegally acquired wealth".
During the aftermath of the 2010 Manila hostage crisis, Tulfo was severely criticized for his on-air phone interview with hostage-taker Rolando Mendoza which was said to have escalated the incident leading to the deaths of eight hostages.
In 2018, it was revealed by the Commission on Audit that the Department of Tourism (DOT), then headed by Tulfo's sister Wanda, paid around ₱60 million to Bitag Media Unlimited Inc., a media outfit headed by their brother Ben, to place tourism ads on Kilos Pronto, a blocktimer show on PTV-4 hosted by Tulfo. The transactions were not supported with proper documents such as a memorandum of agreement or contract. On May 8, Wanda Tulfo Teo resigned from her post. She stressed that she did not know that her brothers were running the television show and that it was a government-to-government contract between the tourism department and People's Television Network. However, on June 17, 2018, it was revealed that they have not yet returned the money they received from the DOT. In August 2018, then-Senator Antonio Trillanes IV declared that he will press plunder charges against the Tulfo siblings.

On May 31, 2019, Tulfo made an on-air tirade against Social Welfare Secretary and retired Army Commanding General Rolando Bautista for refusing to interview with him. A few days later, thousands signed a petition demanding Tulfo to apologize. The Philippine Military Academy Alumni Association condemned Tulfo's remarks against the former Philippine Army chief. Tulfo has apologized to Bautista for his remarks.

In 2022, Tulfo's citizenship was disputed when he was appointed Secretary of Social Welfare and Development by then-President-elect Bongbong Marcos in May 2022. In December, the Commission on Appointments bypassed his appointment for the second time due to his American citizenship, which he had admitted to have from 1986 to renouncing it in early 2022, and his conviction on four counts of libel.

Other ventures
Tulfo is also a franchisee and endorser of Siomai King, a food cart business selling shumai.

Filmography

Television

Radio

Awards

PMPC Star Awards for Television
Best Male Newscaster (2014, 2015 and 2016)

Inding-Indie Short Film Festival
Asian Best Broadcasters Award (2015)
Most Trusted Media Personalities for Radio and Television Award (2016)

References

Year of birth missing (living people)
Living people
Secretaries of Social Welfare and Development of the Philippines
Bongbong Marcos administration cabinet members
Filipino radio journalists
Filipino television news anchors
Filipino YouTubers
People from Metro Manila
Erwin
United States Army soldiers
IBC News and Public Affairs people
ABS-CBN personalities
ABS-CBN News and Current Affairs people
TV5 (Philippine TV network) personalities
News5 people
People's Television Network
Filipino Roman Catholics
University of the East alumni
Former United States citizens